Joseph Rupert Benjamin (November 4, 1919 – January 26, 1974) was an American jazz bassist.

Born in Atlantic City, New Jersey, Benjamin played with many jazz musicians in a variety of idioms. Early in his career he played in the big bands of Artie Shaw, Fletcher Henderson, Sy Oliver, and Duke Ellington.

Later credits include work with Roland Kirk, Hank Garland, Dave Brubeck, Marian McPartland, Louis Armstrong (in his later years), Mal Waldron, Jo Jones, Gary Burton, Sarah Vaughan, Roy Haynes, Art Taylor, and Brother Jack McDuff.

Benjamin never recorded as a leader.

Partial discography

As sideman
With Bob Brookmeyer
Traditionalism Revisited (World Pacific, 1957)
With Kenny Burrell
Weaver of Dreams (Columbia, 1960–61)
Guitar Forms (Verve, 1964–65)
With Dave Brubeck
Jazz Impressions of Eurasia (Columbia, 1958)
With Harry Edison
The Swinger (Verve, 1958)
Mr. Swing (Verve, 1958 [1960])
Harry Edison Swings Buck Clayton (Verve, 1958) with Buck Clayton
With Duke Ellington
All Star Road Band (Doctor Jazz, 1957 [1983])
With Dizzy Gillespie
The Great Blue Star Sessions 1952-1953 (EmArcy, 1952-53 [2004])
With Barry Harris
Preminado (Riverside, 1961)
With Roy Haynes
Jazz Abroad (Emarcy, 1955)
With Johnny Hodges
Triple Play (RCA Victor, 1967)
With Budd Johnson
Blues a la Mode (Felsted, 1958)
Budd Johnson and the Four Brass Giants (Riverside, 1960)
With Roland Kirk
Kirk's Work (Prestige, 1961)
With Gary McFarland
The Jazz Version of "How to Succeed in Business without Really Trying" (Verve, 1962)
With Carmen McRae
Book of Ballads (Kapp, 1958)
With Gerry Mulligan
The Teddy Wilson Trio & Gerry Mulligan Quartet with Bob Brookmeyer at Newport (Verve, 1957)
Blues in Time (Verve, 1957) with Paul Desmond
Two of a Mind (RCA Victor, 1962) with Paul Desmond
With Jerome Richardson
Midnight Oil (New Jazz, 1959)
With Al Sears
Things Ain't What They Used to Be (Swingville, 1961) as part of the Prestige Swing Festival
With Joya Sherrill
Joya Sherrill Sings Duke (20th Century Fox, 1965)
With Rex Stewart
Rendezvous with Rex (Felsted, 1958)
With Sonny Stitt
Sonny Stitt & the Top Brass (Atlantic, 1962)
With Buddy Tate
Swinging Like Tate (Felsted, 1958)
With Clark Terry
Color Changes (Candid, 1960)
Everything's Mellow (Moodsville, 1961)
With The Three Playmates
The Three Playmates - The Three Playmates with George Barrow, Jerome Richardson, Budd Johnson, Sam Price, Kenny Burrell, Joe Benjamin, Bobby Donaldson, Ernie Wilkins (arranger) (Savoy Records, 1957)
With Sarah Vaughan
Sarah Vaughan with Clifford Brown (EmArcy, 1954)
In the Land of Hi-Fi (EmArcy, 1955)
Swingin' Easy (EmArcy, 1957)
With Mal Waldron
The Quest (New Jazz, 1961)
With Kai Winding 
Dance to the City Beat (Columbia, 1959)

References

[ Joe Benjamin] at Allmusic

1919 births
1974 deaths
American jazz double-bassists
Male double-bassists
Musicians from New Jersey
20th-century American musicians
20th-century double-bassists
20th-century American male musicians
American male jazz musicians